Susie Suh is the debut album by American singer-songwriter Susie Suh.  It was released on Epic Records in 2005. The CD is marked with the Copy Control logo.

Critical reception

Alex Henderson of AllMusic concludes his review with, "The singer/songwriter field is amazingly crowded these days, but Suh is a cut above many of the female singer/songwriters who emerged in the early and mid-2000s and shows considerable promise on her first album."

Liane Hansen of NPR writes, "Suh's lyrics are introspective. And though she shares a homonym with wailer Siouxsie Sioux of Banshees fame, her music is on the softer side."

Track listing

Media appearances
"Recognition", "All I Want", "Seasons Change", and "Light on My Shoulder" have been played in the American drama series One Tree Hill. "Shell" was featured on the soundtrack to the film Must Love Dogs.

Personnel

Musicians

Susie Suh – guitar, piano, vocals
Glen Ballard – keyboards, piano, string arrangements
Matt Chamberlain – drums
Jimmy Johnson – bass
Michael Landau – guitar
Tim Pierce – guitar
Benmont Tench – organ (Hammond), piano, music contractor

Production

Glen Ballard – producer
Charles Koppelman – executive producer
Don Rubin – executive producer
Doug Sax – mastering
Tom Sweeney – assistant engineer
Kevin Mills – assistant engineer
Scott Campbell – engineer, mixing
Jez Colin – mixing
Michelle Holme – art direction
Sheri G. Lee – art direction
Jolie Levine-Aller – music contractor, production coordination

Track information and credits adapted from the album's liner notes.

References

2005 debut albums
Albums produced by Glen Ballard
Epic Records albums